Massachusetts House of Representatives' 9th Worcester district in the United States is one of 160 legislative districts included in the lower house of the Massachusetts General Court. It covers part of Worcester County. Republican David Muradian of Grafton has represented the district since 2015.

Towns represented
The district includes the following localities:
 Grafton
 Northbridge
 Upton

The current district geographic boundary overlaps with those of the Massachusetts Senate's 2nd Worcester district and Worcester and Norfolk district.

Former locales
The district previously covered:
 Holden, circa 1872 
 Oakham, circa 1872 
 Princeton, circa 1872 
 Rutland, circa 1872

Representatives
 James Allen, circa 1858 
 Solon S. Hastings, circa 1859 
 John J. Allen, circa 1888 
 Charles Waite Gould, circa 1920 
 Jeremiah P. Keating, circa 1920 
 William P. Di Vitto, circa 1951 
 Maurice Edward Fitzgerald, circa 1951 
 John R. Driscoll, circa 1975 
 Marsha Platt, 1993-1995
 George N. Peterson Jr.
 David K. Muradian, Jr, 2015-current

See also
 List of Massachusetts House of Representatives elections
 Other Worcester County districts of the Massachusetts House of Representatives: 1st, 2nd, 3rd, 4th, 5th, 6th, 7th, 8th, 10th, 11th, 12th, 13th, 14th, 15th, 16th, 17th, 18th
 Worcester County districts of the Massachusett Senate: 1st, 2nd; Hampshire, Franklin and Worcester; Middlesex and Worcester; Worcester, Hampden, Hampshire and Middlesex; Worcester and Middlesex; Worcester and Norfolk
 List of Massachusetts General Courts
 List of former districts of the Massachusetts House of Representatives

References

External links
 Ballotpedia
  (State House district information based on U.S. Census Bureau's American Community Survey).
 League of Women Voters Grafton & Shrewsbury

House
Government in Worcester County, Massachusetts